Reginald Hanke (born 25 August 1956) is a German politician of the Free Democratic Party (FDP) who has been serving as a member of the Bundestag from the state of Thuringia since 2019.

Early life and career 
In 1979 Hanke began training as a decorative painter, which he followed with a master's degree. In 1985 he started his own business in Breternitz with a painting company.

Political career 
Hanke joined the FDP in 2014. For the Bundestag elections 2017 he ran for office in the election district Saalfeld-Rudolstadt - Saale-Holzland district - Saale-Orla district and on list number 3 of the FDP Thuringia. After the resignation of Thomas Kemmerich, Hanke became a member of the Bundestag on 15 November 2019. In parliament, he serves on the Sports Committee and the Petitions Committee.

References

External links 

 Bundestag biography 
 

1956 births
Living people
Members of the Bundestag for Thuringia
Members of the Bundestag 2021–2025
Members of the Bundestag 2017–2021
Members of the Bundestag for the Free Democratic Party (Germany)